Al-Fuwayhat is one of the affluent residential districts of Benghazi, Libya.

Landmarks 
  Libyan International Medical University

References

Populated places in Benghazi District